Düz Cırdaxan (also, Diiz Cırdaxan, Dyuzdzhirdakhan, and Dyuzdzhyrdakhan) is a village and municipality in the Tovuz Rayon of Azerbaijan.  It has a population of 2,681.

References 

Populated places in Tovuz District